William Manson (14 April 1882 – 4 April 1958) was a British theologian.

Life

He was educated at the University of Glasgow, where he graduated in 1904. Later he studied  at the Oriel College in Oxford, when he graduated in 1908. In the same year he returned to Glasgow and entered United Free Church College for studying Theology and training as a minister of the Free Church of Scotland. In 1911 he was ordained as a minister. From 1911 to 1914 he had a charge at Oban. In 1914 he married Mary D. Ferguson. In the same year he became minister at Pollockshields East in Glasgow.

In 1919 he was appointed to the Chair of New Testament at Knox College in Toronto. In 1925 he became professor of New Testament at the University of Edinburgh. In 1946 he was appointed to the Chair of Biblical Criticism at the University of Edinburgh. In 1952 he retired from teaching. William Manson died in 1958.

He is buried in Grange Cemetery in south Edinburgh with his wife Mary Dickie Ferguson (d.1972). The grave lies on the south wall in the south-west corner of the original cemetery next to the grave of Rev A. M. Renwick.

References 

British theologians
1882 births
1958 deaths
Alumni of the University of Glasgow
Alumni of Oriel College, Oxford
Academics of the University of Edinburgh